Siracusa may refer to:

 Province of Syracuse, Sicily
 Syracuse, Sicily, the capital of the Italian province of the same name
 A.S.D. Città di Siracusa, the football team currently representing the city, also known as Siracusa Calcio
 U.S. Siracusa a defunct football club
 A.S. Siracusa a defunct football club
 Chiara Siracusa (born 1976), a Maltese singer
 Mayla Siracusa (born 1980), a Brazilian water polo player

See also
Syracuse (disambiguation)